The  was a structural fire that began at about 01:00 local time on September 1, 2001 in the Myojo 56 building, located in the Kabukichō section of Shinjuku, Tokyo, Japan.

The fire, the fifth-deadliest in post-war Japanese history, burned for five hours before being extinguished and resulted in the deaths of 44 people. It is suspected that the fire resulted from arson, but no suspect was ever arrested. In the aftermath of the incident, media coverage (which declined after the September 11 attacks that happened 10 days later) focused on the arrest and conviction of the property owners for criminal negligence and on the building's putative ties to organized crime.

Fire

The fire burned on the third floor of the building. When the fire broke out, 19 people were on the third floor and 28 people were on the fourth floor. Three employees jumped out of the building from the third floor and survived, suffering injuries. Witnesses who saw one of the employees called an ambulance.

Emergency responders arriving to treat the jumpers learned of the building fire and evacuation efforts commenced.  Firefighters removed the bodies of 44 people (32 men and 12 women) from inside the building, and rescued those who managed to flee to the roof.

Victims

Female
Sayuri Nakamura, 22
sisters Aiko and Ayako Ueda, 25 and 28
Kiyoko Shimizu, 29
Miyuki Ichikawa, 19
Misae Tsakamoto, 24
Megumi Ieta, 18
Rena Yumimoto, 26
Suki Makao, 31
Chieko Watarase, 21
Rie Fukushima, 35
Suzuka Isogai, 38

Male
Taichi Matsuda, 53
Aoi Yoshioka, 28
Shion Miyamoto, 41
Kyo Fujimoto, 37
Tomomi Sugimoto, 27
Katsumi Itou
Isamu Nozawa
Daisuke Fujisawa
Rokuro Matsuda
Hanzō Shinoda
Jiro Kusumoto
Nao Himura
Ryōsuke Nakajima
Yū Ishikawa
Yuki Ishikawa
Hanzō Satō
Shigeru Urano
Ichirou Yuuki
Hajime Miyajima
Hifumi Miyagawa
Kyo Matsumoto
Tadashi Miyashita
Rokurou Hoshino
Kazuhiko Kumamoto
Hanzou Kawaguchi
Nobuharu Kiyoko
Toshikazu Matsubara
Several unnamed victims

Aftermath 

Police officials remarked that the lethality of the fire was exacerbated by numerous violations of the fire code, including blocked fire doors and stairwells. The main cause of death among the fire's victims was found to be carbon monoxide poisoning.  An investigation conducted by the Metropolitan Police Department concluded that if the building's automated fire doors had not been prevented from closing, deadly gases would not have reached the building's occupied rooms for at least 20 minutes.

One injured man, seen near the burning building, later disappeared. The building was demolished in May 2006, and replaced with a one-story restaurant.

Criminal allegations
Six individuals were arrested in conjunction with the blaze, on charges of professional negligence resulting in death. Those charged included two executives of the Myojo Kosan Group, which owned the building, and the commercial tenants of the structure, which housed a video mahjong parlor and a hostess bar. On July 2, 2008, five of the defendants were convicted of negligence in the Tokyo District Court. The sixth defendant was acquitted.

By July 3, 2008, Tokyo police had concluded that the fire resulted from arson, but had not made any corresponding arrest.

Japan Today, an English-language online news outlet, quoted Tokyo police as stating that the mahjong parlor located in the building was "an illegal gambling den" with daily revenues of about eight million yen.  Japan Today report speculates that the Chinese mafia and yakuza could have been linked to the incident, as illegal gambling operations are regularly forced to pay "protection money" to organized crime syndicates.  However, there is no material or eyewitness evidence of organized crime involvement in the fire.

See also

Carbon monoxide poisoning
List of major crimes in Japan
List of massacres in Japan
Sennichi Department Store Building fire
Kyoto Animation arson attack (2019)
2021 Osaka building fire

References

External links
Deadly Explosion, Fire In Tokyo CBS, September 1, 2001
Fire, Explosion Kills 44 in Tokyo Nightclub CNN, September 1, 2001
At least 44 die in Tokyo explosion The Guardian, September 1, 2001
Police arrest six over deadly Kabukicho fire The Japan Times, February 19, 2003
Victims' families sue over Kabukicho fire deaths in 2001 The Japan Times, February 23, 2003
Kabukicho fire deathtrap to be razed The Japan Times Weekly, May 13, 2006
 Kabukicho fire Disaster Prevention System Institute

2001 in Tokyo
2001 murders in Japan
2001 fires in Asia
2001 disasters in Japan
Arson in Japan
Building and structure fires in Japan
Buildings and structures in Shinjuku
Crime in Tokyo
Deaths from carbon monoxide poisoning
Disasters in Tokyo
Mass murder in 2001
September 2001 crimes
Unsolved crimes in Japan
Unsolved mass murders
Commercial building fires
Shinjuku